Purple is the fifth extended play by South Korean girl group Mamamoo. It was released by RBW on June 22, 2017, and distributed by CJ E&M Music. It contains five songs, including the single "Yes I Am".

Release 
The EP was released on June 22, 2017, through several music portals, including Melon, and iTunes for the global market.

Single 
"Yes I Am" was released as the lead single in conjunction with the EP on June 22.

Track listing

Charts

Weekly charts

Monthly charts

Year-end charts

Awards

Music program awards

References

2017 EPs
Mamamoo EPs
Korean-language EPs
Stone Music Entertainment EPs